Herpetopoma pumilio, common name the diminutive top shell, is a species of sea snail, a marine gastropod mollusk in the family Chilodontidae.

Description
The height of the shell reaches 3 mm.

Distribution
This marine species occurs off Western Australia.

References

External links
 To World Register of Marine Species

pumilio
Gastropods described in 1893